Ben Laughlin may refer to:

 Ben Laughlin (cricketer) (born 1982), Australian international cricketer
 Ben Laughlin (ten-pin bowler), professional bowler
 Ben Laughlin (baseball), 19th century professional baseball player